WVLD (1450 AM) better known as "WVLD Rock 93.3" is a radio station  broadcasting a mainstream rock format. Licensed to Valdosta, Georgia, United States, the station serves the Valdosta area. The station is currently owned by Black Crow Media.

As of September 1, 2015, WVLD 1450 was once again simulcasting their signal on 106.9 FM. The Black Crow Media rock station (formerly WWRQ Rock 108) was moved to WVLD and rebranded at "WVLD Rock 106.9".

History
As of February 11, 2008, WVLD 1450 started simulcasting on 106.9 FM and branded under that frequency. The station also shifted the weekday programming lineup away from all ESPN to include ESPN's Mike and Mike in the Morning, the Neal Boortz Show, the Clark Howard Show, and the Dave Ramsey Show. On the weekends, WVLD still carried ESPN Radio. However, the station was later branded as "106.9 FM WVLD" instead of former "ESPN 1450". 

On February 1, 2013, WVLD changed format to classic rock, branded as "The Eagle". It later rebranded as "Rock 106.9".

On August 6, 2021, WVLD rebranded as "Rock 93.3", with the launch of new translator W227DP 93.3 FM Valdosta. The 106.9 FM translator has gone silent.

Previous logo
 (WVLD's logo under previous 106.9 translator)

References

External links

VLD
Radio stations established in 1992
1992 establishments in Georgia (U.S. state)